Donald Collins (born November 11, 1942) is an American former politician from Vermont. Collins, a Democrat from Franklin County, served in the Vermont Senate. He first served from 2002 to 2008. He was re-elected in 2008, 2010, 2012 and 2014.

Collins was born in Lowell, Vermont, and resides in Swanton. He earned his B.A. from Johnson State College, an M.A. from the University of Maine and a Certificate of Advanced Graduate Study from the University of Vermont. Collins served on the Swanton School Board.

References

1942 births
Living people
People from Lowell, Vermont
People from Swanton (town), Vermont
Democratic Party Vermont state senators
School board members in Vermont
Johnson State College alumni
University of Maine alumni
University of Vermont alumni